Enn Säde (born on 18 October 1938 in Pärnu) is an Estonian film sound designer and film director.

In 1961 he graduated from Leningrad Institute of Film Engineers.

Since 1961 he worked at Tallinnfilm. Since 1993 he is a freelance sound designer.

Awards:
 1990: nominated to Nika Award
 2001: Order of the White Star, V class.

Filmography

 1969 "Uksed"
 1980 "Metskannikesed"
 1981 "Nukitsamees" 
 1984 "Karoliine hõbelõng"
 1985 "Naerata ometi"

References

Living people
1938 births
Estonian film directors
Recipients of the Order of the White Star, 5th Class
People from Pärnu